The Connaught Armoury is a former Canadian armoury located at 10310 85 Avenue in Edmonton, Alberta, Canada. This building was built in 1911–12 in what was then the City of Strathcona at a cost of $35,000.  The early twentieth century, two-storey, rectangular brick building is the oldest armoury in Alberta.

Facilities
In addition to a main floor drill hall, it incorporated storerooms for arms, saddles and uniforms; offices and a caretaker's apartment. In the basement, the drill hall had a rifle range and bowling alley.

History
The Edmonton Historical Board Plaque states:" Edmonton is home to several armoury buildings, reflecting the importance of the armed forces in our city's history. The Connaught Armoury was built in what was then the City of Strathcona in 1911-12. It was named for Prince Arthur, Duke of Connaught and Strathearn, the third son of Queen Victoria and Canada's Governor-General from 1911 to 1916."

The armoury was built to house the B Squadron of the 19th Alberta Dragoons. The 19th Alberta Dragoons was a cavalry, and later armoured regiment which served during the First World War and in the Second World War. After the Second World War, it became the 19th Alberta Armoured Car Regiment. When the Dragoons were removed from the Order of Battle in 1964–5, the City of Edmonton acquired the armoury from the federal government.

Legacy
The building was vacant for 14 years. The building has been leased out to various restaurants over the years, but they did not succeed. The Strathcona Legion Branch 150 requested the use of the armoury after the building they were occupying became too expensive to continue using. However, Edmonton City Council decided to use the building as a drop-in centre for the Youth Emergency Shelter Society.

See also

List of Armouries in Canada

References

Historic Edmonton—An Architectural and Pictorial Guide, page 78–79 
Old Strathcona Business Assoc. News Letter February 2006

Infrastructure completed in 1911
Armouries in Canada
Provincial Historic Resources in Edmonton
Buildings and structures in Edmonton